The  is a major railway line in Japan, owned by the East Japan Railway Company (JR East). It connects Takasaki Station in Gunma Prefecture with Miyauchi Station in Niigata Prefecture, linking the northwestern Kanto region and the Sea of Japan coast of the Chūbu region. The name refers to the old provinces of Kōzuke (上野) and Echigo (越後), which the line connects.

Services
Before the opening of the Jōetsu Shinkansen in 1982, the Joetsu Line had frequent service by express trains connecting Tokyo and Niigata. With the opening of the Jōetsu Shinkansen, however, the line became dominated by local and freight trains.

The branch of the Jōetsu Shinkansen between Echigo-Yuzawa Station and Gala-Yuzawa Station (the Gala-Yuzawa Line) technically belongs to the Joetsu Line.

Stations

Rolling stock

Present

Local
Takasaki to Minakami
 211-3000 series 4- and 6-car EMUs (since August 2016)

Minakami to Nagaoka
 E129 series 2/4-car EMUs (since November 2015)

Takasaki to Shin-Maebashi (Takasaki Line, Ryomo Line through services)
 E231-1000 series
 E233-3000 series

Limited Express
Takasaki to Shibukawa (Takasaki Line, Agatsuma Line through services)
 651-1000 series 7-car EMUs (Kusatsu limited express services since March 2014)

SL
SL Gunma Minakami and SL YOGISHA Minakami
 JNR 12 series 6-car Vehicles and C61-20

Former

Local
Takasaki to Minakami
 115-1000 series 4-car EMUs (until March 2018)

Minakami to Nagaoka
 115 series 2/3/4-car EMUs (until March 2016)

Limited Express
Takasaki to Shibukawa (Takasaki Line, Agatsuma Line through services)
 185 series 7-car EMUs (Kusatsu limited express services until March 2014)

Four-car 211-3000 series EMUs entered service on the section between Takasaki and Minakami from 23 August 2016.

History

The Nippon Railway opened the Takasaki to Maebashi (now Shinmaebashi) section in 1884. The company was nationalised in 1906.

The first railway between Niigata and the east coast of Honshu was the Ban'etsu West Line, completed in 1914. In 1920, it was decided to build the Jōetsu Line as a more direct route between Tokyo and Niigata. The Miyauchi to Echigo-Yuzawa section opened in stages between 1920 and 1925, and the Shinmaebashi to Minakami section of the line opened in stages between 1921 and 1928.
  
In 1931, with the completion of the 9,702 m Shimizu tunnel, the Echigo-Yuzawa - Minakami section of the line opened, including electrification at 1,500 V DC between Echigo-Yuzawa and Ishiuchi. When completed, the line shortened the Ueno to Niigata route by 98 km, and included two spiral sections in the tunnels.

In 1947, the Takasaki to Minakami and Ishiuchi to Miyauchi sections were electrified, making this one of the first non-urban JNR lines to be completely electrified.

The Takasaki to Shinmaebashi section was double-tracked in 1957, and the rest of the line was double-tracked between 1961 and 1967, the final section involving the construction of the 13,500 m Arashimizu tunnel.

Service disruptions
The 2004 Chūetsu earthquake seriously damaged the Jōetsu Line, closing the Minakami to Miyauchi section for about two months. Single-line operation at speeds limited to 30–45 km/h then resumed, being raised to 45–65 km/h four months after the earthquake, and the second track reopened, also with speed restrictions, 5 months after the quake. Full service was restored 9 months after the line had first closed.

In late July 2011, torrential rainfall damage resulted in the closure of the Echigo-Yuzawa - Muikamachi section for two weeks.

References

External links

 Stations of the Jōetsu Line (JR East) 

 
Lines of East Japan Railway Company
Rail transport in Gunma Prefecture
Rail transport in Niigata Prefecture
Railway lines opened in 1920
1067 mm gauge railways in Japan